In Sweden, a friggebod is a small house which can be built without any planning permission on a land lot with a single-family or a duplex house.  It is named after Birgit Friggebo, who was the Minister for Housing in 1979 when the new type of building was allowed. The word is a portmanteau of Friggebo and bod, the Swedish word for shed.

Restrictions
Originally no more than 10 square metres, the maximum size was raised to 15 square metres in 2008.  The friggebod regulations also allow the building of a canopy and a wall of wood or brick to protect a patio. The buildings do not have to follow the zoning regulations, but they have to comply with the building code  and cannot be built closer to a neighbour's land lot than 4.5 metres without that neighbour's permission.

Sources

See also 
Alternative housing
Cottage
Tiny house
Construction trailer
Simple living
Garden buildings

External links
 Boverket: Image describing the distances
 Shedworking: Friggebod Friday

House types
Architecture in Sweden